The , sometimes abbreviated JSA or NSK, is the body that operates and controls professional sumo wrestling (called ōzumō, 大相撲) in Japan under the jurisdiction of the Japanese Ministry of Education, Culture, Sports, Science and Technology (MEXT). The purposes of the Association are also to develop the means dedicated to the sport and maintain, manage and operate the facilities necessary for these activities. Therefore the JSA operates subsidiaries such as the Kokugikan Service Company to organize its economic aspects, the Sumo School to organize training and instruction or the Sumo Museum to preserve and utilize sumo wrestling records and artefacts.

Though professionals, such as active wrestlers, referees, hairdressers and ushers, are all on the Association's payroll, the organization can only be run by retired wrestlers. The organization has its headquarters in the Ryōgoku Kokugikan arena, in Sumida, Tokyo.
Following a number of scandals, the Association revised its running and achieved numerous reforms in the past decades.



Overview
The Association has a long and rich history that dates back to the ancient rites of Shinto. Established in 1925 to award the "Prince Regent Cup" (later Emperor's Cup) during main tournaments, the Association became a Special Incorporated Foundation then a Public Interest Incorporated Foundation in 2014.

History

The Association has its origins in a Shinto ritual (or festival) that has been held since ancient times to pray for a bountiful harvest. This primary form of sumo was called Shinji-zumo (神事相撲). In 1757, during the Hōreki era, the beginnings of the Association were established as "Edo-sumo Kaisho" (江戸相撲会所), later called Tokyo-sumo.

 During the Edo period, sumo bouts (called kanjin-sumo, 勧進相撲), were often held to raise funds to develop provinces (new construction or repair of bridges, temples, shrines and other public buildings) or for entertainment purposes. Sumo wrestling was also actively practiced among samurai as a form of combat training called buke-sumo (武家相撲). Local rulers, or daimyō, controlled sumo and gained financing from it. On the other hand their protection to wrestlers was a guarantee of status. Rikishi were appointed as vassals of feudal lords and became samurai as well as being the champions of the feudal domain to which they were linked. Shōgun Tokugawa Ieyasu specifically wanted "street" sumo prohibited and determined sumo should only be held for charitable purposes (perpetuating kanjin-sumo). The wrestlers were also paid with extra revenue from these events. Written rankings, known as banzuke, were introduced from 1761 and the assembly of lords that organized these rankings began to emerge as a full fledge organization. In this time, sumo came to be called "ōzumō" (大相撲), "grand sumo" or professional sumo. As sumo began to showcase the power of daimyo, lords began to codify the sport and negotiated with each other to secure ownership of wreslters under a system called kakae (抱え). Slowly, noble houses (the most prominent of which was the ) began to develop methods of sponsor to ensure dominance over this popular form of entertainment. Licenses began to be introduced in the eighteenth century, creating the rank of yokozuna (in 1789), or the rank of tate-gyōji ; both of them still existing today. 

In the 19th century, the Meiji Restoration leaders abolished the shogunate and the feudal system that supported it. To adapt and survive, the lords introduced the change to the system of salaries and directors that is known today. In 1884, Emperor Meiji began to support sumo tournaments which helped to give sumo wrestling a reputation as a national event. However, due to the diminishing power of lords that regulated the sport, parallel organizations began to develop their own form of tournaments. In 1869, the Osaka-sumo Association (大坂相撲協会, Ōsaka zumou kyōkai) was founded and created a rivalry that emulated the history of sumo. Each associations had their own history and changes. For example, from 1888 to 1894 the "Hirōkaku-gumi" (廣角組), composed of Onaruto stable and Tonori stable, broke off from Osaka-sumo. In December 1925, Tokyo-sumo became the Greater Japan Sumo Association (Dai-Nihon Sumō Kyokai, 大日本相撲協会).
In January 1927, Osaka-sumo merged with the Greater Japan Sumo Association after a long decline. The 88 elders of the Tokyo contingent and the 22 elders from the Osaka contingent merged and disputed their first common tournament with a common banzuke during the Hatsu basho (January tournament). In the run-up to the merger during 1925 and 1926, a series of three joint tournaments was held to assess the relative strength of the rikishi in both organizations. Confirming the prevailing opinion that Osaka-sumo was inferior, the Tokyo camp largely won out and wrestlers as high as ōzeki in Osaka sumo were relegated to the third makushita division in the new merged rankings. However, the yokozuna from both sides were maintained, as there was no precedent for demoting them, allowing Osaka-sumo to save face. Later that year, the first chairman of the Association, Lieutenant-General Hirose Masanori, was named. The strike of the wreslters led to the foundation of the Kansai Sumo Association (Kansai Kakuryoku Kyokai, 関西角力協会) by members of the Dewanoumi ichimon. The secessionist association later dissolved.
In 1944, the first successor from the sumo world was chosen and former Tsunenohana became chairman of the Association. After the war, the Association was further modernized. Due to sumo being seen as the national sport, the Association was ancillaried to the Ministry of Education, Culture, Sports, Science and Technology in 1958 as a Special Incorporated Foundation and named Japan Sumo Association. In 2014, it shifted to a Public Interest Incorporated Foundation.

Missions
In order to maintain and develop the traditions and order of Sumo, the Association is mainly responsible for holding competitive tournaments (called honbasho) in January, March, May, July, September and November. The Association also holds regional tours (called ). The Japan Sumo Association holds these tournaments each year with different purposes for each kind. Main tournaments are televised and help to maintain the interest of sumo as a sport by broadcasting the competitions. The jungyō meanwhile are important for the popularity of wrestlers and allow fans to meet them in the form of meet and greet events. 

The Association is also responsible for the recruitment, instruction and training of rikishi via the heya system or the Sumo School. Although not all wrestlers are salaried (only sekitori ranked wrestlers are), the Association provides a small allowance to all of them when they enter Grand Sumo. Depending on the wrestler's performance during tournaments, the Association is also responsible of the wrestlers ranking. As wrestlers are not the only employees of the Association, it also oversees the recruitment of yobidashi, tokoyama and gyōji to maintain the traditional settings of Sumo. Non-traditional occupations are also the responsibility of the Association, in particular to maintain the operation of businesses linked to the Association (such as the Kokugikan sales department, the restaurant or the yakitori skewer factory). 

Bearing the responsibility of the sport's long history, the Association oversees the preservation and utilization of sumo archives.

Organization
The Japan Sumo Association is a Public Interest Incorporated Foundation since 2014. Therefore its functioning is of a non-profit organization and its activities are regulated through a top-down system of government supervision, as well as adherence to strict establishment conditions in exchange of preferential treatments under the tax system. Its operations are authorized and defined by the administrative agency of the Act on Authorization of Public Interest Incorporated Associations and Public Interest Incorporated Foundation (Act No. 49 of 2006).
Professor Mark D. West defined the organization of the Association as a "complex web of formal legal rules and informal social norms" while the association's choice to apply rules or to defect to norms "is based on a calculation of comparative efficiency". In this case, "legal rules" refers to the legislative and judicials provisions as well as the organizational rules nominally approved by the Ministry of Education, as sumo's supervising agency, where social norms are traditional constraints not enforceable by law.
The Japan Sumo Association relations between its members are primarily shaped by rules and norms related to the ownership and transfer of the "elder stocks" held by the Association elders. Of all the employees of the Association only them can manage the organization.

The toshiyori kabu system

Former wrestlers gain the right to participate in the functioning of the Association by inheriting a share (called a kabu), of which there are 105. 
The value of these shares was extremely high and rules only permitted former sumo wrestlers who either reached at least a san'yaku rank (komusubi or higher) or been ranked for a significant number of tournaments as a sekitori to purchase them. Since the introduction of the Japan Sumo Association as a Public Interest Foundation, the shares were no longer purchasable, but rather collectively managed by the Association. Japanese citizenship is also a prerequisite. 
 
Each share is associated with a particular name, and in the sumo world the former wrestler will be known by that name, usually with the suffix oyakata. The members are also often called elders in English. 
An exception to the normal acquisition is made for the most successful rikishi, former yokozuna, who may be offered a "one generation" elder stock (called ichidai toshiyori) without having to use a traditional share in the Association and enter their retirement duties with their wrestling name. Since this exception system has been in place, three former wrestlers (Taihō, Kitanoumi and Takanohana) have obtained this status. A fourth, Chiyonofuji, was offered this status but preferred a normal share and became Kokonoe-oyakata. These four all achieved more than twenty tournament championships in their active careers. In October 2021, yokozuna Hakuhō, the Emperor's Cup number record holder, was however denied the ichidai toshiyori kabu and Masayuki Yamauchi (a Yokozuna Deliberation Council member) declared to a press conference that "no such system exists".

The members of the Association receive a salary and are expected to assist in the running of their stable and the Association, from selling tickets and security work at the most junior level, to taking charge of one of the Association departments as a director.

These members are also the only persons given the authority to train new sumo wrestlers. They do this by opening or taking over a training stable, or heya (changed to beya as a suffix) which will take the same name as the founder's elder name. Thus Dewanoumi-oyakata will be the owner of Dewanoumi-beya. Typically about 50% of the Association members have their own stable, while the rest are required to be affiliated with one and assist the principal owner. It is common for the most senior members of the Association to concentrate on their Association responsibilities and pass the day-to-day management of a stable to another. If a senior oyakata wishes to do this, the two may elect to swap names so that the stable can keep the more prestigious name. A recent example was in 1996, when the Association's chairman Dewanoumi-oyakata (former yokozuna Sadanoyama), swapped names with Sakaigawa-oyakata (former sekiwake Washūyama) who took over the running of Dewanoumi stable.

The Association members are also split into various ranks. A new retiree will begin his career as a coach at toshiyori rank (commonly called oyakata), except for former ōzeki and yokozuna who are automatically granted Committee Member rank. The most senior Association members are Committee Members.

All members are required to retire when they reach the age of sixty five (with a possible five year extension if approved by the board of directors), after which they can pass their name to another, provided that person meets the Association's eligibility requirements. In the case of a one-time membership mentioned above the name merely lapses. Like the toshiyori kabu system there can be only a limited number of them.

Other personnel

The Association also employs a certain number of other personnel, mainly to ensure the process of tournaments. Therefore, auxiliary personnel such as referees (gyōji), ushers (yobidashi) and hairdressers (tokoyama) are all employees of the Association. Contrary to wrestlers that do not possess a kabu, these employees are usually kept within the Association until their retirement. The Association supervise their training, usually provided by the seniors of the field of activity, and ranking. Highest ranking personnels (such as tate-gyōji) often hold press conference for their retirement. 
The Association also have a particular system for retired wrestlers who did not matched the requirements for inheriting a kabu. These former wrestlers are kept within the Association as contract employees, even if they still use their old shikona as professional name, and are tasked with various tasks. They can be separated in two distinctive roles:
Wakamonogashira (若者頭), or "youth leader" are retired wrestlers (usually from jūryō or a maegashira) who serves as functionaries of the Association. They typically work at their former stables or within the associated ichimon. Wakamonogashira  are tasked to arrange maezumō matches and supervising young sumo wrestlers from makushita and below. They are often seen receiving the trophies given to the tournament winner at the bottom of the dohyo to store them backstage during the honbasho closing ceremony. There is currently 8 wakamonogashira positions within the Association.
Sewanin (世話人), or "caretaker", are also part of this system. They are the transportation and storage managers of the Association's equipments. They serves according to the instructions of other superiors (mainly wakamonogashira). They also belong to sumo stables. There are currently 13 sewanin positions within the Association.

Departments

Association organization
The Association is ruled by a series of departments and committees into which the oyakata are divided when they enter their new career as coaches.

Advisory body

To this organization adds an advisory body called the Yokozuna Deliberation Council.

Elections

The possession of a toshiyori kabu is essential for the functioning of Association as elders (assembled in a board of trustees called hyōgiin-kai, 評議員会) votes for the board of the Association. The election process is heavily influenced by the stables regroupments to which coaches are distributed in. Each stable belong to an ichimon, or clan. There is currently five ichimon, each bearing the name of its leading stable: Dewanoumi, Isegahama, Nishonoseki, Takasago and Tokitsukaze. The ichimon serves as quasi-political groupings, each clan nominating candidates for the ten positions or so that are available on the Association's board each election cycle. Each vote is normally along the interests of the ichimon, which explain why the bigger clans more often holds the Association's chairmanship. Former wrestler popularity however plays a role in the in the credit given to an application. For example, former yokozuna Takanohana won 4 straight election bids to become director before his demotion in 2018, despite being the leader of a small ichimon.  Stables aren't equally divided among the ichimon. As of October 2022, Nishonoseki has the most heya with 15 but Dewanoumi has the most affiliated oyakata (elders) with 35.

As in the political world intrigue, subterfuge, splits and new coalitions are ordinary. The oyakata have a lot of leeway and can decide many things on their own. In fact, some elders change stables, move their stable to different ichimon or break off from their clan. For example, the Kokonoe stable was founded in 1967 after yokozuna Chiyonoyama failed to gain control of the Dewanoumi stable. The break off that ensued saw the stable leaving the Dewanoumi ichimon to join the Takasago ichimon. Also, in 2010, Takanohana stable (run under the "one in a generation kabu" system by the eponymous yokozuna) broke off from the Nishonoseki ichimon (with Ōnomatsu stable, Ōtake stable and Magaki stable) as he wanted to present himself to the board's election and his clan would not permit it. He became the leader of its own group, which was then formally recognized as an ichimon (called Takanohana ichimon) in 2014. The ichimon was however short lived and was disbanded in 2018 after the Takanoiwa affair.
Until 2018, there have been non-aligned heya, or lose coalitions that weren't formal ichimon, but in 2018 the JSA ruled that all stables had to belong to one of the current clans.

To strengthen the bonds between each stables of a same ichimon, the various clans hold joint practices (called ) prior to tournaments.

Board of the Association
As of February 2023:

Board of directors
Directors (called riji) are elected by a single anonymous vote by all the elders assembled in a board of trustees (called hyōgiin-kai, 評議員会) from candidates selected among the toshiyori and external candidates. Prior to 2014, 4 active sumo wrestlers serving as representatives and both the tate-gyōji had the right to vote, but with the transition to a public interest incorporated foundation, sumo wrestlers and referees no longer have the right to vote. 
In September 2008, at the Ministry of Education's insistence after a series of scandals hit sumo, three external directors were appointed. One of the three, served as acting Chairman for the July 2010 tournament while the then head, Musashigawa, was suspended.
The board of directors elects a chairman (called rijichō, primus inter pares) from among themselves. Directors other than the chairman serve as department heads. Each board member serves a two-year term.

Deputy Directors

Special Executives

Counselor committee
Introduced in 2014, the counselor committee (Hyōgi-in, 評議員) is responsible for monitoring the shared interests of the ministry and the Association. Therefore, it is made up equally of retired oyakata (with no  re-employement) elected within the Association and personalities appointed by the ministry. Their rank equals that of a director to the Association's board. Elders on the committee are not allowed to concurrently serve as oyakata because of the committee authority that allows them to have a say in the appointment and dismissal of directors. Each counselor serves a term of 4 years.
Having the task of "overseeing the execution of duties by the directors", auditors may attend meetings of the Board of Directors and the Board of Trustees, but have no voting rights.

List of past rijichō

Controversies

In the decade from 2007 to 2017, the Association had to deal with a number of affairs like the Tokitsukaze stable disciple assault death case (2007), the case of foreign sumo wrestlers possessing and smoking cannabis (2008), the baseball gambling and match-fixing scandal (2010-2011), yokozuna Harumafuji's assault incident (2017) and the ban on women. While the Association had always benefited from leniency on a certain number of its practices, the evolutions of Japanese society and the ever more frequent media coverage of the scandals surrounding the Association contributed to the reaction of the latter and to the establishment of reforms in this world yet governed by immutable rules.

Links with criminals
In 2010, the Japan Sumo Association announced its decision to dismiss ōzeki Kotomitsuki and the Ōtake-oyakata (former Takatōriki), for betting on baseball games in a gambling ring run by the yakuza. At the same time, two stable masters were demoted and an unprecedented 18 wrestlers banned from the July 2010 tournament. Sumo Association chairman Hanaregoma declared in August 2010 that "violent groups or antisocial forces" were being banned from accessing tournament venues, training stables and other facilities. The Association issued a statement on the matter, stating "the Japan Sumo Association are aware of their social responsibility and declare that they will work to eliminate anti-social forces such as organized crime groups". Since then, members of organized crime groups are not allowed in sumo venues (such as the Ryōgoku Kokugikan, stables, supporters' associations and celebrations.

Unequal treatments and accusation of racism
As the Association have the mission to perpetuate sumo traditions, a certain number of its practices and comments are often seen as dated. The treatment of injured wrestlers is often pointed out as unfair. In recent times, both yokozuna Hakuhō and Kakuryū drove criticism from the Yokozuna Deliberation Council for extended periods where they sat out tournaments due to injury. However, in the meantime, injured Japanese yokozuna Kisenosato did not get any critics and rather had encouragement from the council. The difference of treatment prompted criticism on the supposed preferential treatment.

The inequality of treatment between wrestlers also drove suspicion of racism within the institution. The controversy arose when The Nihon Keizai Shimbun reported that Samoan-born ozeki Konishiki had alleged racial discrimination was the reason for him being denied promotion to sumo's top rank of yokozuna. The New York Times subsequently quoted Konishiki as saying, "If I were Japanese, I would be yokozuna already."  The Japan Sumo Association demanded an apology. Konishiki held a press conference during which he made his apology and tearfully denied making the remarks.
More recently, during the retirement of era defining Hakuhō ,  the "Experts' Meeting on the Succession and Development of Grand Sumo" (directed by Yamauchi Masayuki, a member of the Yokozuna Deliberation Council), which the Japan Sumo Association consulted on how sumo should be in response to the new era, suddenly came up with a proposal for "the abolition of the ichidai toshiyori kabu." The reason mentioned was that "there is no provision in the articles of incorporation of the Association that serves as a basis." The Association faced severe criticism in particular on the basis of previous suspicions of racism. However it is assumed the decision was taken to prevent the rise of another Takanohana controversy by giving a wrestler too much prestige.

Violence and hazing
Sumo stables were well known for their systematic hazing and physical punishment of young disciples in order to "toughen them up". Stable masters have often been proud to show to the media how they frequently use a shinai to beat those who fall out of line, and elder wrestlers are often put in charge of bullying younger ones to keep them in line, for instance, by making them hold heavy objects for long periods of time. Also, the strict sumo hierarchy where senior and high-ranking wrestlers take responsibility to train their juniors often led to violence as in sumo the rank is a symbol of status.
The system of hazing was widely criticized in late 2007. A hazing scandal was exposed in which a Tokitsukaze stable's 17-year-old sumo trainee died after a serious bullying incident involving his stablemaster Jun'ichi Yamamoto hitting him on the head with a large beer bottle and fellow rikishi being subsequently ordered to physically abuse him further. The stablemaster and three other wrestlers who were involved were arrested in February 2008, after which Japanese Prime Minister Yasuo Fukuda demanded the JSA take steps to ensure such an incident never happens again. In May 2009, Yamamoto was sentenced to six years in jail. 
Violence affairs also came up to light in 2017, when Japanese newspaper Sports Nippon reported that yokozuna Harumafuji had assaulted fellow Mongolian wrestler Takanoiwa during a regional sumo tour in Tottori in late October. According to the report and other sources, Harumafuji was drinking with other sumo wrestlers (including Hakuhō, Kakuryū and Terunofuji) and was admonishing Takanoiwa over his behavior. Angered that Takanoiwa was looking at his cell phone at the time, Harumafuji struck him in the head with a beer bottle and punched him 20 to 30 times. Harumafuji was then questioned by the Sumo Association's crisis management panel, where he admitted to assaulting Takanoiwa. 
 On October 25, 2018, the Association issued a statement introducing external experts involved in training, operation of procedures, and other measures to prevent the recurrence of violence. However, this did not stop the violence scandals, and, on December 26, 2022, Isegahama-oyakata announced his resignation as director after a case of violence, where two junior wrestlers in his stable acted violently against younger wrestlers, with the victims beaten with wooden beams and burned with chankonabe hot water poured on their backs.

Communication

Logo

The Japan Sumo Association, like most institutions, owns a mon. The design is based on cherry blossom, which is the national flower of Japan. Around the flower, two stylized "dai" (大) characters, extracted from the kanjis of professional sumo (ōzumo, 大相撲), can be seen. The logo was created in 1909 for the opening of the first Ryōgoku Kokugikan.
This symbol can be found in various places when the Association holds celebration. It can be mainly seen on the tsuriyane'''s (suspended roof above the dohyō) curtains (called mizuhiki, 水引).

Ukiyo-e
In 1985, the Japan Sumo Association created a partnership with nishiki-e artist  in the hope of reviving old sumo ukiyo-e works. He collaborated on the official ebanzuke. His portraits of wrestlers are sold at the Ryōgoku Kokugikan.

Mascots

On August 31, 2009, the Japan Sumo Association unveiled a group of official mascots under the title . Designed to get more children interested in the sport, the characters are chickens (鶏, which can be read as とり, tori in Japanese) as chicken are considered good luck in sumo. A chicken walks on two legs, not four; similarly, a sumo wrestler loses the match if he is knocked off his feet and touches the ground with his hands or any part of his body. The characters compete in sumo and are centered around main character , a pun on hiyo (ひよ) meaning chick, and his rival .

YouTube channels
The Japan Sumo Association launched its first YouTube channel on November 5, 2018, with content all in Japanese language. The channel offers light-hearted and humoristic videos, such as a golf competition between former yokozuna Hakuho, Kisenosato and Kakuryu or Chanko-nabe receipes with small skits featuring low-ranking wrestlers. It also provides more serious contents with insights on ceremonies held in the Kokugikan, such as the consecration of the dohyo before each tournaments or danpatsu-shiki (hair cutting ceremony). Old tournaments are also regularly  reruned on the channel. 
In August 2022, the association launched an English-language YouTube channel called Sumo Prime Time in hopes of drawing a larger international audience to the sport. This new channel, presented by former NHK sumo sportscaster Hiroshi Morita, provides basic sumo explanations such as rikishi routine or training and kimarite moves. It also provides exclusive interviews of oyakata and rikishi, generally the winner of the previous tournament. The general tone of the channel is light-hearted.

Partnerships
In October 2021, the Japan Sumo Association formed a partnership with the Pokémon company to celebrate the 25th anniversary of Pokémon Red and Blue. During the Wanpaku National Championship (a kid sumo tournament held in October) and the November tournament, 200 Pokemon themed kensho banners were displayed and gyōji wore poké ball themed kimono. The Japanese YouTube channel Pokémon Kids TV also created a serie of videos involving oyakata (former Kisenosato, Wakanosato and Toyonoshima) training Makuhita and presenting sumo culture to Pikachu.

See also

List of sumo elders
List of sumo stablesHeya, sumo stable Toshiyori'', sumo elder
International Sumo Federation
Japan Sumo Federation

Notes
1.As of January 2023, Nishonoseki have 15 stables, followed by Dewanoumi (14), Isegahama (6), Tokitsukaze (5) and Takasago (4). However Dewanoumi have 35 affiliated oyakata, followed by Nishonoseki (30), Tokitsukaze (16), Isegahama (12) and Takasago (10).
2-5.Former wrestlers use their toshiyori kabu during their terms.
6. Counselors are referred with their birth name as they hold this position after their retirement.

References

External links
Japan Sumo Association statutes and financial information 

Sports organizations established in 1925
1925 establishments in Japan
Organizations based in Tokyo
Sumida, Tokyo
Sumo organizations
Sumo